Yang Li-tsing (born 13 December 1968), better known internationally by her stage name Cynthia Khan, is a Taiwanese actress. She starred in many Hong Kong and Filipino girls with guns films.

Early life
Yang studied Chinese and jazz dance i school. At 17, she won a national talent contest run by a Taiwanese television station. She later learned taekwondo and achieved a high level in this martial art.

Career
In 1987, Yang made her film debut in In the Line of Duty 3. The film's box office success started her long career. Sequels and other films followed, many of them in the girls with guns genre, most notably In the Line of Duty 4: Witness, directed and choreographed by Yuen Woo-ping and co-starring Donnie Yen. 

She now lives in Taiwan.

Origin of stage name
Her screen name is a combination of the names of established Hong Kong stars Cynthia Rothrock and Michelle Yeoh (then known as Michelle Khan), whom she replaced in the In the Line of Duty movie series.

Filmography

Film

Television

References

External links
 
 Cynthis Khan at filmaffinity.com
 chinesemov.com - Cynthia Khan

1968 births
20th-century Taiwanese actresses
21st-century Taiwanese actresses
Living people
People from Chiayi County
Taiwanese female dancers
Taiwanese female martial artists
Taiwanese film actresses
Taiwanese television actresses